Bruce K. Reid (17 March 1950 – 15 June 1970) was an Australian rules footballer who played with South Melbourne in the Victorian Football League (VFL).

Reid came from the New South Wales town of Leeton, which was in South Melbourne's zone. He made two appearances for South Melbourne in the 1968 VFL season, as a half back flanker. The following year he was tried, without success, at full-forward.

He was killed in a car accident in 1970.

References

1950 births
Australian rules footballers from New South Wales
Sydney Swans players
Road incident deaths in Australia
1970 deaths